Evil Zone, stylized as EVIL Z♀NE in the PAL region, is a fighting game developed by Yuke's Future Media Creators for the PlayStation in 1999. The player can choose from ten characters to fight in several game modes including story mode, arcade mode, versus mode, practice and survival mode.

Story 
The story of the game tells of Ihadurca, a powerful being who exists in multiple dimensions at once. The inhabitants of the world of I-Praseru (Happy Island) were able to temporarily confine Ihadurca in a dimension known as Evil Zone. A tournament is held to select the strongest warrior throughout the dimensions. The champion will be tasked to destroy Ihadurca before she can escape the Evil Zone and threaten the world once more.

The story mode is presented as an anime. Every playable character has their own unique story, each including their unique title movie and cutscenes narrated by the playable character. The cutscenes are animated in an anime style and drawn by the animation studio  AIC.

Gameplay 
During the game, fighting occurs on a 3D field, with characters allowed to move forwards, backward, and sidestep left and right. Most of the fighting is done with range-based attacks, but it is possible to attack a short-range and use grapple moves on your opponent. The fighting system only utilizes two main moves types: attack and guard.

Each playable character has a unique move set and ultra-attack. An ultra-attack is a powerful move that requires 'Power Stocks' to perform.  'Power Stocks' are obtained by the character standing still and charging; characters can hold up to three stocks at a time. The less health a character has, the faster it takes to charge.

A 'Pressure Dash' can occur if both characters perform a dash attack, towards each other, at the same time. If a 'Pressure Dash' occurs, each player must rapidly hit buttons; the winner gains an advantage over their opponent.

Characters 
There are 10 playable characters in Evil Zone, including the story's antagonist, Ihadurca:
 Setsuna Saizuki - "The Guardian Angel"
 Linedwell Rainrix - "A Medium at Daybreak"
 Erel Plowse - "Mercenary"
 Gally 'Vanish' Gregman - "The Bounty Hunter"
 Keiya Tenpoouin - "The Man in the Shadow"
 Midori Himeno - "Grappler and Passionate"
 Danzaiver - "Exceptional Inspector"
 Alty Al Lazel - "Wizard"
 Kakurine - "Priestess"
 Ihadurca - "The Absolute Existence"

Reception 

The game received mixed reviews according to the review aggregation website GameRankings. In Japan, Famitsu gave it a score of 27 out of 40.

Notes 

b.Written as character - "Alias"

References

External links 
 

1999 video games
3D fighting games
Anime International Company
Multiplayer and single-player video games
PlayStation (console) games
PlayStation (console)-only games
Science fantasy video games
Titus Software games
Video games about demons
Video games developed in Japan
Video games featuring female protagonists
Video games about parallel universes
Video games scored by Satoshi Miyashita
Video games with alternate endings
Yuke's games